The ATP Buzios (aka Kolynos Cup) was a men's tennis tournament played in Búzios, Brazil. The event was played as part of the ATP Tour in 1991 and 1992.  It was played on outdoor hard courts.

Results

Singles

Doubles

External links
 ATP World Tour archive

Buzios
Buzios
Buzios
Sport in Rio de Janeiro (state)